Cool Burnin' with the Chet Baker Quintet is an album by trumpeter Chet Baker which was recorded in 1965 and released on the Prestige label.

Reception

Allmusic rated the album with 3 stars.

Track listing 
All compositions by Richard Carpenter and Gladys Bruce except where noted.
 "Hurry" – 4:53
 "I Waited for You" (Gil Fuller, Dizzy Gillespie) – 6:33
 "The 490" (Tadd Dameron) – 6:10
 "Cut Plug" (Richard Carpenter, Sonny Stitt) – 4:39
 "Boudoir" – 6:23
 "Etude in 3" – 5:12
 "Sleeping Susan" (Jimmy Mundy) – 8:45

Personnel 
Chet Baker – flugelhorn
George Coleman – tenor saxophone
Kirk Lightsey – piano
Herman Wright – bass
Roy Brooks – drums

References 

Chet Baker albums
1967 albums
Prestige Records albums